"Easy as Pie" is a song written by Rory Bourke, Gene Dobbins and Johnny Wilson, and recorded by American country music singer Billy "Crash" Craddock. It was released in October 1975 as the first and title track from the album Easy as Pie. The song was a #1 hit on the country charts and was a crossover hit. A live version was also released on 1977's Live! and 2009's Live -N- Kickin'.

Chart performance

References

1975 singles
Billy "Crash" Craddock songs
Songs written by Rory Bourke
1975 songs
ABC Records singles
Dot Records singles
Songs written by Gene Dobbins
Songs written by Johnny Wilson (songwriter)